Shalkar is a town in the Aktobe Region of Kazakhstan.

Shalkar may also refer to:

Shalkar District, a district in Kazakhstan
Shalkar (village), Karaganda Region, Kazakhstan
Shalkar (North Kazakhstan Region), a village in the North Kazakhstan Region
Shalkar (lake), a lake of the Ural basin, Terekti District, Western Kazakhstan
Shalkar (Kokshetau), a lake in the Kazakh Uplands, Kazakhstan
Lake Shalkar, a lake in the Shalkar District, Aktobe Region
Shalkarteniz (formerly "Chalkar-Teniz"), a lake in the Yrgyz District, Aktobe Region, Kazakhstan
Shalkarkol, also known as Rudnichnoye lake, Pavlodar Region, Kazakhstan
Shalkar-Yega-Kara, a lake in Orenburg Oblast, Russia
Shalkar Radio, a unit of Radio Kazakhstan